Ilya Davidenok (born 19 April 1992 in Almaty) is a Kazakhstani cyclist, who is currently suspended from the sport until April 2028.

Doping
In 2014, Davidenok tested positive for Anabolic Steroids at the Tour of Qinghai Lake and the Tour de l'Avenir, a fourth such positive test for  within seven weeks. He was suspended for two years by the UCI, losing his overall win at the Tour of Qinghai Lake in the process.

In November 2019, Davidenok returned a positive doping test for EPO and the 2019 Tour of Fuzhou. In December 2021, he was banned for eight years, eligible to return to competition in April 2028.

Major results

2011
 1st Stage 2a Vuelta a la Independencia Nacional
2013
 7th Overall Tour of Estonia
2014
 1st  Road race, National Road Championships
 1st Stage 4 Tour de l'Avenir
 8th Road race, UCI Under-23 Road World Championships

 1st  Overall Tour of Qinghai Lake
1st Stage 10

2016
 6th Overall Tour of Hainan
 7th Overall Tour of Taihu Lake
2017
 2nd Overall Tour of Iran (Azerbaijan)
1st  Mountains classification
1st  Young rider classification
 6th Overall Tour de Kumano
2018
 1st  Overall Tour of Fuzhou
1st Points classification
 7th Overall Tour of Qinghai Lake
2019

 2nd Overall Tour of Fuzhou
1st Stage 1

 9th Overall Tour of Xingtai

References

External links

1992 births
Living people
Kazakhstani male cyclists
Sportspeople from Almaty
Doping cases in cycling
Kazakhstani sportspeople in doping cases
Tour of Azerbaijan (Iran) winners
20th-century Kazakhstani people
21st-century Kazakhstani people